Shambu "Shambhu" Tamang (20 October 1955 – 7 July 2022) was a Nepalese mountaineer who once held the record as the youngest person to successfully ascend Mount Everest, reaching the summit on May 5, 1973.  Previous records differed on his actual age at the time of the successful climb; although most records claimed he was 16 years of age, it is currently believed he was actually 17 years 6 months old.  Tamang's record was surpassed in May 2001 by Temba Tsheri.

Tamang, who had since repeated his ascent of the summit from northern side, owned a trekking company in Kathmandu.

See also
List of 20th-century summiters of Mount Everest
List of Mount Everest records

References

External links
Shambu Tamang at everersthistory.com
Everest Timeline at NPR

1955 births
2022 deaths
Nepalese mountain climbers
Nepalese summiters of Mount Everest
Nepalese Buddhists
Tamang people